Damiano Longhi (born 27 September 1966) is an Italian football manager and former player, who played as a midfielder.

Career
He played for Modena, Padova, Pescara (on loan from Padova), Hércules CF, Reggiana, Castel di Sangro, Treviso and Fiorenzuola.

External links
Player profile at FootballPlus.com
Profile at Lega Calcio

1966 births
Living people
Italian footballers
Italian expatriate footballers
Modena F.C. players
Calcio Padova players
Delfino Pescara 1936 players
A.C. Reggiana 1919 players
Treviso F.B.C. 1993 players
A.S.D. Castel di Sangro Calcio players
Hércules CF players
U.S. Fiorenzuola 1922 S.S. players
Serie A players
Serie B players
La Liga players
Expatriate footballers in Spain
Association football midfielders